Zakiullah Zaki is an Afghan cricketer. He played a single ODI for Afghanistan in the World Cricket League. He also represented them at under 19's level during the 2010 Under-19 Cricket World Cup.

External links
Zakiullah Zaki at ESPNcricinfo
Zakiullah Zaki Afghanistan Cricket Board official website

References

1990 births
Living people
Afghan cricketers
Afghanistan One Day International cricketers
Cricketers from Kabul